Plácido de Castro Futebol Club, commonly known as Plácido de Castro, is a Brazilian football club based in Plácido de Castro, Acre. The club currently competes in Campenato Acreano, the top division of the Acre state football league.

Rio Branco is currently ranked fourth among Acre teams in CBF's national club ranking, at 205th place overall.

History
The club was founded on 3 November 1979. The club finished in the third position in the Campeonato Acriano in 2008. They competed in the Série D in 2011. Plácido de Castro won the Campeonato Acriano in 2013.

Honours

Domestic

State 

 Campeonato Acreano:

 Winners (1): 2013
 Runners-up (1): 2011

Stadium
Plácido de Castro Futebol Club play their home games at Estádio Municipal José Ferreira Lima. The stadium has a maximum capacity of 3,000 people.

References

Association football clubs established in 1979
Football clubs in Acre (state)
1979 establishments in Brazil